Mossblown is a village in South Ayrshire, Scotland, a little larger than neighbouring Annbank. It was a coal mining community but the mines have been closed for some time now. There is a book available written by a local historian entitled 'Old Annbank and Mossblown' which provides more written and pictorial information about the village. Most recently (2010–11), the population of the village has grown, with new housing, both private and council, being added to the village's north-east boundary on the B743, the Ayr to Mauchline road. This is the third latest expansion in housing development since a private housing scheme was built in Mossblown's south-eastern quarter in the 1990s, adjacent to the old Annbank Church (and cemetery which serves the populations of both Mossblown and Annbank). More recently there have been expansions to the north eastern part of the village, including the newest development  Limekiln Wynd and slightly older Johnston drive.

Rail Links

A railway which still runs through the village used to serve as the main rail link from Stranraer to London, but this route has long since been demoted from public service, and all London to Stranraer services now go via Ayr. Until the mid-1960s, there was a thriving railway station located in the middle of the village, although it did not take its name from the village which hosted it, and instead was known as Annbank Station. Nearby, on the northern half of the village, a signal junction box stood for many years and required operators to manually change the signals and direct trains either north towards Tarbolton station or eastwards towards Annbank and Trabboch. A small BT telephone exchange now sits in the space that this station used to occupy.

Changes in Appearance

Although the majority of the current younger generation of Mossblown residents have experienced very few changes in the village's appearance, older residents can tell of how the village has changed considerably in character. For example, until the late 1940s - early 1950s, there was a working farm located near the centre of the village, called Whiskeyhall Farm. A nearby street takes its name from this farm.

The area to the north-east of Mossblown, where Sloan Avenue and Mossbank Place are located today, looked a lot different in the 1930s, 1940s and 1950s: this part was known as Drumley (the nearby Drumley House School takes its name from here – sadly this has been demolished and to date awaits a new landowner). There was a working pit, also called Drumley, and the houses, built for the pit workers, consisted of two miners' 'rows', the 'long row' and the 'wee row' (single storey dwellings, often housing large families, nine or more, in two or three rooms). There was a community 'wash hoose' (wash house) where the wives would meet and do all their families' washing, while the husbands would work long hours down the nearby pit.

Sport

There are currently two amateur football teams in the village: Mossblown AFC and Drumley AFC.  Both teams play in the Ayrshire Amateur league. The village is also served by a sports activity centre.  Typical activities within the centre include football, badminton, short tennis, gymnastics, netball, mini-netball, basketball, volleyball, archery, aerobics, roller hockey, dance classes, circuit training and various martial arts groups.  The centre comprises a main hall  and a squash court.  There is also a small gymnasium containing both cardiovascular and resistance equipment.

Amenities

Opposite the Activity centre on the B742 road to Annbank, the village was served by its local library until 2017.  This service was moved in 2017 and now resides in the grounds of Annbank Primary School.  The school's playground is fenced off and parking facility is available within the grounds adjacent to the library building.  This service is provided as part of Ayrshire Council's portfolio and continues to thrive after many years even in the face of the new e-reader technologies.

As of October 2017 there is one public house in the village called The Fourways.  This pub is situated at the 'toll' end of the village on the south side at the junction of the Annbank and Sandyford roads.  Whilst a popular venue, in truth, regulars from all over the village will populate either according to their preference.  Other villagers see The ‘Tap O’ The Brae’ pub on Annbank's Weston Brae as their regular.  For many years there existed the Mossblown (Working Men's) Social Club, but recently this has been demolished and now residential properties sit on the site adjacent to the village Keystore groceries and post office shop. see next:-

There is a grocery store across the road from the old Working Men's Social Club site.  This shop now hosts the post office services.  Next door is a fast food Chinese Take Away outlet.  The village also comprises a Tandoori and fish and chip takeaway, a hairdresser and a betting shop.

Two bus routes (numbers 43 + 43a) serve the village, connecting Mossblown with Ayr to the south, Annbank to the east and Tarbolton and New Cumnock to the North. Times vary accordingly but generally two buses per hour allow villagers to commute to Ayr, with its proximity of  giving villagers access to high street retailers.

Mossblown also has a primary school named Annbank primary it is located on Annbank road and accommodates Mossblown and Annbank. It has recently (2017) had an expansion with the old dining hall/sport hall has been demolished. The expansion now houses the village library, the dining Hall and sports facilities for the school. Annbank and Mossblown are in the catchment area for Ayr Academy.

Other amenities in  the village include a local pharmacy (currently being refurbished/modernised as of Feb 2018) situated down by the Mossblown Activity centre at the SE Toll end of the village is the Taiglum Medical Practice. http://www.taiglummedical.co.uk/

Lloyds Kitchens and Bathrooms have a branch on the B744 Annbank Road opposite the Taiglum medical Practice: http://www.lloydkitchens.co.uk/kitchen-bathroom-showroom-ayr

Transport links to Ayr and Tarbolton, Mauchline, Cumnock (No. 43 service) and Annbank (43A) are provided by regular Stagecoach services running approximately every half hour on weekdays and slightly reduced at weekends.

The north eastern boundaries of the village on the B743 road towards Tarbolton and Mauchline were extended to include a housing scheme called The Meadows.  Opposite this scheme is a care home for the elderly called Templehouse Nursing Home. Templehouse Nursing Home

There is a thriving childcare provision at The Meadows towards the north of the village:  https://www.themeadowsprivatedaynursery.com/

References

Villages in South Ayrshire